Koffi Bar in Telugu and Nimidangal in Tamil, is a 2011 Indian thriller film directed by Geetha Krishna. The film was presented by Lakshmi Ganapathi Film.

Cast 
Shashank as Ramakrishna
Bianca Desai as Srijana
Atul Kulkarni as a rich businessman
Suman as a CBI officer
Baby Shivani
Moushmi in an item number

Production 
The film was planned to be shot in Telugu-Kannada (as Koffi Shop) and Tamil (as Nimidangal) and began production in 2009. Biana Desai, known for glamorous roles, played a role without makeup for the film. Newcomer Murali from New York was brought to cinematograph the film along with M. V. Raghu. The film was shot in Hyderabad, Bangalore, and Chennai. The film's plot begins in a coffee shop. Hindi actress Moushmi did an item number in the film. The film was shot for only three days in Bangalore. As a result, the Kannada version stopped production midway after the Karnataka Film Chamber Of Commerce found out that the film was dubbed from Telugu and that more than fifty percent of the film was not shot in Karnataka. For the Tamil promotions of the film, Shashank was referred to as Shasha and Bianca Desai was referred to as Priyanka.

Soundtrack
The director turned the music director for the first time. Lyrics by Vanamali who previously collaborated with Krishna for the Telugu dub of Time (1999).

Release and reception
The film was scheduled to release on 4 March and later 11 March 2011.

Y. Sunitha Chowdhury of The Hindu opined that "Despite Geeta Krishna's dramatic flabbiness, the film has its moments". Deepa Garimella of Full Hyderabad wrote that "This is a film begging to be ignored. Pay attention".

Home media
Sun TV bought the broadcasting rights for both the Telugu and Tamil versions.

References

Notes 

Indian thriller films
2011 thriller films